Pus is an exudate produced by vertebrates during inflammatory pyogenic bacterial infections.

Pus or PUS may also refer to:
 -pus, a taxonomic suffix meaning "foot"
 Pus (film), a 2010 Turkish film
 pus, the ISO 639-2 code for the Pashto language
 Gimhae International Airport, Busan, South Korea, IATA code
 Permanent Under-Secretary in the UK government
 , now Aalto University Sports Club, Finland

See also
 Puss (disambiguation)